Philip Thomas Bezanson (January 6, 1916 – March 11, 1975) was an American composer and educator.

Life
Born in Athol, Massachusetts, he graduated from Yale University School of Music in 1940 and after war services enrolled in the graduate program of composition at the State University of Iowa where he joined its faculty eight years later. In 1951 he received his Ph.D. and later became head of composition. He was made a professor in 1961. He was given a Distinguished Alumnus award by Yale.

A prolific and productive composer, Bezanson won several prestigious awards and received commissions from, among others, Dimitri Mitropoulos, who commissioned a piano concerto in 1952. His most famous work is perhaps the opera Golden Child, written in 1960 to a libretto by Paul Engle. The work was commissioned by the NBC Opera Theatre and first performed on television on the Hallmark Hall of Fame program. Several of his vocal and choral works use texts by Engle as well.

His notable students included Olly Wilson, M. William Karlins, Karen Tarlow, and James Yannatos. 

He was a National Patron of Delta Omicron, an international professional music fraternity.

List of works

Stage works

 Golden Child, opera in 3 acts (1960)
 Stranger in Eden, opera in 3 acts (1963)

Orchestral works

 Symphony no 1 in b
 Symphony no 2
 Cyrano de Bergerac, overture
 Dance scherzo
 Fantasy, fugue and finale for strings (1951)
 Concerto for piano and orchestra (1952)
 Rondo-prelude for orchestra (1954)
 Anniversary Overture (1956)
 Capriccio Concertante (1967)
 Sinfonia Concertante (1971)

Chamber works

 Children's suite, piano (1946)
 Sextet for woodwinds and piano (1956)
 Divertimento for eight wind instruments
 Duo for cello and piano (1965)
 Brass sextet (1974)

References

1916 births
1975 deaths
20th-century classical composers
People from Athol, Massachusetts
Yale School of Music alumni
University of Iowa alumni
University of Iowa faculty
American male classical composers
American classical composers
20th-century American composers
Classical musicians from Massachusetts
20th-century American male musicians